Barrington is an unincorporated Canadian rural community of about 4,000 people on the northeast corner of Barrington Bay in Shelburne County, Nova Scotia.

Barrington is part of the much larger Municipality of the District of Barrington, also wholly within Shelburne County.

History
Barrington's inhabitants are mostly descendants of the first settlers from Chatham and Harwich on Cape Cod, Massachusetts who emigrated to the area during the 1760s. One such settler was Solomon Kendrick, father of John Kendrick, explorer and maritime fur trader. Solomon moved from Harwich, Cape Cod, to Barrington in the 1760s.

There are several interesting historical sites in the second of the villages which have as part of their name Barrington. Actually Barrington Head is named only locally as such because of it being located at the head of Barrington Bay. The actual village is that of Barrington, but for geographical identity we shall accept the three names stated above.

The first of the historical sites is that of the Barrington Woolen Mill situated on the Barrington River near where it lets out into Barrington Bay. This popular site houses some of the equipment used for preparation, processing and manufacturing of woolen products. The site is open about five months of the year with a guide in period costume to interpret the nature of the exhibits for the public.

The second of the sites is that of the Old Meeting House. This church was the earliest in the area and is a favorite for many of the history buffs travelling through the area. It has a raised pulpit which is accessed by a stairs up the back. Surely the minister was closer to heaven when preaching there. Another of the curious items found there is the offering boxes on long handles so as to allow the ushers to not have to bodily pass in front of the parishioners while receiving the offerings.

The third historical site is the 2/3 replica of the lighthouse on Seal Island. The original was located on Seal Island some 20 miles at sea, west of Clark's Harbour on Cape Sable Island. Visitors love to climb to the top and view the vistas available on clear sunny days. This is a favourite for those maritime enthusiasts who love lighthouses.

In popular culture
Disguised as "Barringford," Barrington is the main setting of Canadian novelist Hugh Hood's debut 1964 novel, White Figure, White Ground.

See also
 List of communities in Nova Scotia

References

External links
Barrington on Destination Nova Scotia

Communities in Shelburne County, Nova Scotia
General Service Areas in Nova Scotia
Populated coastal places in Canada